Sar Taruna (also Romanized as Sar Tarūnā; also known as Sar Tanūrān) is a village in Abtar Rural District, in the Central District of Iranshahr County, Sistan and Baluchestan Province, Iran. At the 2006 census, its population was 33, in 8 families.

References 

Populated places in Iranshahr County